Jittery Joe's is a chain of coffeehouses based in Athens, Georgia. In 1994, the first Jittery Joe's opened in downtown Athens, near the famed 40 Watt Club. They offer fresh coffee roasted in-store. There are now nine locations in Athens and one in each of the Georgia cities of Watkinsville, Atlanta, Bethlehem, and St. Simons.

Overview 
The inspiration for the name "Jittery Joe's" came from an episode of The Simpsons in which Marge visits a diner with that name ("Marge on the Lam," which first aired on November 4, 1993). The founders discovered that "Jittery Joe's" wasn't trademarked, so they adopted it as the brand label of their coffee company.

Jittery Joe's expanded into the New York market in August 2009, opening a shop next door to the Laboratory Institute of Merchandising (LIM).  Drawing acclaim from the New York Times within a month of opening, the store instantly became a Midtown favorite.  The store closed in January 2013.

Jittery Joe's occasionally collaborates with local artists, such as with the recording of Jeff Mangum's album Live at Jittery Joe's and releasing lines of coffee for Kishi Bashi and Widespread Panic. Along with music artists, Jittery Joe's has partnered with several other local Athens businesses, such as Terrapin Beer Company, BikeAthens, and Kindercore Vinyl to create custom coffee blends. In December 2016, the company partnered with the local group Extra Special People to create Java Joy, a program to provide people with disabilities opportunities in the workforce. Jittery Joe's began teaching participants how to roast and serve coffee in 2018, then provided a mobile coffee cart which the employees use to serve the brand's coffee while engaging with local communities and events.

Professional cycling team 

Jittery Joe's sponsors a UCI Continental team consisting of professional and amateur riders that compete primarily in USA Cycling Professional Tour and UCI America Tour road bicycle racing events.

The company served as the premier title sponsor of the Jittery Joe’s Pro Cycling Team powered by Zero Gravity, which competes in road bicycle racing events throughout the United States and has raced internationally in Australia and South Africa. In 2008, after failing to secure a secondary sponsor, the team dropped from pro to amateur status.

See also
 List of coffeehouse chains

References

External links 
 

Coffeehouses and cafés in the United States
Restaurants established in 1994
Companies based in Athens, Georgia
Coffee brands
1994 establishments in Georgia (U.S. state)